Clontarf  may refer to:

Placenames

Australia 
Clontarf, New South Wales
Clontarf, Queensland, a suburb of the Moreton Bay Region
Clontarf, Queensland (Toowoomba Region), a locality in the Toowoomba Region

Ireland 
 Clontarf, Dublin

United States 
Clontarf, Minnesota

Other
Battle of Clontarf, 1014
Clontarf (ship), New Zealand immigration ship of 1858-60
Clontarf (whiskey), an Irish brand
Clontarf FC, a rugby union club based in Clontarf, Dublin
Clontarf Foundation, an Australian non-profit educational foundation for indigenous students
Clontarf Aboriginal College, the current name of a former orphanage in the Perth suburb of Waterford in Western Australia.